Air Marshal Vinod Bhatia, PVSM, AVSM, VrC and Bar is a retired Indian Air Force officer. He is also known as 'Jimmy'.

He was awarded Vir Chakra in both 1965 and 1971 wars.

Military awards and decorations

References 

Indian Air Force air marshals
Indian Air Force officers
Indian aviators
Indian Air Force
Pilots of the Indo-Pakistani War of 1965
Pilots of the Indo-Pakistani War of 1971
Indian military personnel of the Indo-Pakistani War of 1971
Living people
Recipients of the Vir Chakra
Recipients of the Param Vishisht Seva Medal
Graduates of the Royal College of Defence Studies